The 1950 Colorado Buffaloes football team was an American football team that represented the University of Colorado as a member of the Big Seven Conference during the 1950 college football season. Led by third-year head coach Dallas Ward, the Buffaloes compiled an overall record of 5–4–1 with a mark of 2–4 in conference play, placing sixth in the Big 7.

Schedule

References

Colorado
Colorado Buffaloes football seasons
Colorado Buffaloes football